Turkic history is the history of Turkic peoples. The Göktürks were the first state established under the name of Turk.

Origins 
Turks were an important political identity of Eurasia. They first appeared at Inner Eurasian steppes and migrated to many various regions (such as Central Asia, West Asia, Siberia, and Eastern Europe.) and participated in many local civilizations there. It is not yet known when, where, and how the Turks formed as a population identity. However, its predicted that Proto-Turkic populations have inhabited regions that they could have the lifestyle of Eurasian equestrian pastoral nomadic culture.

Türk was first used as a political identity in history during the Göktürk Khaganate period. The old Turkic script was invented by Göktürks as well. The ruling Ashina clan origins are disputed.

Although there are debates about its inception, the history of the Turks is an important part of world history. The history of all people that emerged in Eurasia and North Africa has been affected by the movements of the Turks to some degree. Turks also played an important role in bringing Eastern cultures to the West and Western cultures to the East. Their own religion became the pioneer and defender of the foreign religions they adopted after Tengrism, and they helped their spread and development (Manichaeism, Judaism, Buddhism, Orthodox, Nestorian Christianity and Islam).

The beginning of Turkic history

3rd century BC 
 240 BC: Great Wall of China built to protect the nation against Inner Asian nomads.
 c. 202 BC: Xiongnu chanyu Modu conquered the Hunyu (渾庾), Qushe (屈射), Dingling (丁零), Gekun (鬲昆), and Xinli (薪犁); The Gekun and Xinli would later appear among the Turkic-speaking Tiele people, respectively, as Hegu and Xue. The Dingling were also proposed to be early Proto-Turkic people or ancestors of Tungusic speakers among the Shiwei. or  related to Na-Dené and Yeniseian speakers,

2nd century BC

1st century BC

1st century

2nd century

3rd century

4th century 
 395: Migration Period

5th century 
 480: Pre-Bulgarians between the Caspian Sea and the Danube

Middle Ages/Turks

6th century 

 540: The re-emergence of the lost Central Asian Turks mentioned in the Ergenekon epic
551: Establishment of the First Turkic Khaganate.
 552: Göktürks revolt against Rouran domination. 
 565: Defeat of the Hephthalites on their war with Göktürks.
 582: Separation of the First Turkic Khaganate.

7th century

Central Asia 
 630: Eastern Turkic Khanate came under Chinese domination, Western Turkic Khanate came under Chinese influence.
 639: Turkic prince Ashina Jiesheshuai's attempt on a Turkic revolt in the Chinese emperor's palace.
 659: Western Turkic Khaganate came under Chinese rule.
 674: The appearance of Turkic mercenaries (Mamluks) in Arab armies.
 681: Second Turkic Khaganate established.
 699: The establishment of the Turgesh Khanate (in present-day Kyrgyzstan)

Eastern Europe 
 626-627: Eastern Roman Emperor Heraclius' request for help from the Khazars, the Khazars' invasion of the Caucasus by defeating the Sassanids
 630: Khazars' settlement in the Don-Volga basin, which was affiliated to the Western Turkic Khaganate, and the establishment of the Great Bulgarian Khanate in the north of the Black Sea.
 651-652: War of the Arab Empire and the Khazars, who overthrew the Sassanids and captured all of Iran
 678: The division of the Great Bulgarian Khanate by the westward pressure of the Khazars

8th century

Inner Asia 

 705-715: Arabs take Transoxiana
 720-735: Orkhon Monuments in Ötüken
 721-737: Turgesh attack against Arabs
 744: The destruction of the Second Turkic Khanate by the rebellious Uyghurs, Karluks and Basmyls
 745: Establishment of the Uyghur Khaganate, independent khanate of Kimeks in what is today Kazakhstan
 750: The strengthening of Arab-Turkish relations after the Abbasids came to the head of the Arab Empire
 751: The entry of the Chinese into Central Asia, the defeat of the Chinese by the Arabs with the help of the Karluks in the Battle of Talas, the conversion of the Karluks to Islam
 762: Uyghur Khaganate aided Tang dynasty in China in suppressing the An-Lu-Shan uprising
 765: Adoption of the Mani religion by the Uyghur Khan Bögü
 766: The dissolution of the Türgesh Khanate by the Karluks of the Uyghur Khanate, the establishment of the autonomous Karluk Khanate, the laying of the foundations of the Oghuz Yabgu State by the Oghuzes who escaped from the Karluks and migrated to the vicinity of the Caspian and Aral lakes.
 789-795: Fight for the throne and decline in the Uyghur Khaganate

Eastern Europe 
 713-737: Khazar-Arab War, Khazar loss of Caucasus
 716: The first written agreement of the Danube Bulgarian Khanate with the Byzantine Empire and the start of taxation
 717-718: Aid of the Bulgarians to Byzantium against the Arab Siege of Constantinople
 740: Adoption of Judaism as the official religion of the Khazars
 745-775: Bulgarian-Byzantine relations tense
 764: Invasion of the Caucasus and western Iran by the Khazars, defeating the Abbasids
 780: Founding of Volga Bulgaria
 792: After the Battle of Markeli, Byzantium began to pay taxes to the Bulgarians again.

9th century

Central Asia 
 821: Uighurs repulse Tibetans
 832: The Uighur Khaganate plunged into turmoil
 840: The collapse of the Uyghur Khanate as a result of the attack of the Kyrgyz people, the establishment of the Kyrgyz Khaganate, the escape of the Uyghurs to the southwest, the Karluks, who did not recognize the Kyrgyz sovereignty, declared their independence and laid the foundation of the Karakhanid State.
 848: The establishment of the Kansu Uyghur Kingdom of the Uyghurs who migrated to the South West
 856: The establishment of the Karahoca Uyghur Kingdom by another Uyghur branch that migrated to the southwest.

Eastern Europe 
 860: The Russians, who expanded to the south, reached Kiev in the Khazar Khaganate.
 861: Migration of Pechenegs around Sri Darya to the north of the Black Sea under the pressure of Oghuzes, Kimeks and Karluks
 880: The formation of the Kimek–Kipchak confederation
 889: The advance of the Pechenegs in the north of the Black Sea to the west under the pressure of the Khazars and Kipchaks
 892: The Pechenegs advancing to the west forced the Hungarians from the Dnieper to migrate beyond the Carpathians, forming an agreement with the Byzantine Empire.

Asia and Africa 
 833-842: The increasing influence of Turkish slave soldiers in the Abbasid palace during Caliph Mutasim's reign
 836: The relocation of the Abbasid capital from Baghdad to Samerra, where the Turkish slave garrison was located
 868: Tulunid sovereignty over Egypt, Syria, Palestine and the north of Iraq but still remain within the Abbasid caliphate

10th century

Central Asia 
 923: The establishment of the Later Tang dynasty by the Shatuo Turks, descended from the Göktürks, in the north of China
 924: The destruction of the Kyrgyz State by the Mongol Khtai, the end of the Turkic rule in Ötüken, the migration of the Kyrgyz to their present homeland.
 934: With Satuk Buğra Khan's acceptance of Islam, the Karakhanid State adopt the religion of Islam
 979: The Shatuo Turks came under the domination of the Northern Song Dynasty, the Turkic presence in the north of China melted.
 990-999: The Karakhanid State destroyed the Samanid Empire, Transoxiana came under Turkic rule after 300 years.

Eastern Europe 
 920: Russo-Pecheneg War
 922: Visit of Ibn Fadlan as ambassador to the Bulgarian Khanate of İdil, which converted to Islam
 940: Russian-Byzantine alliance against Khazars, Khazars lose Crimea
 943: Pechenegs allied with the Russians against the Byzantine Empire
 965: Oghuz Yabgu State's alliance with the Russians against the Khazars
 968-972: Pechenegs' attacks on the Russians
 969: The capture of the Khazar capital by the Russian king Svyatoslav I, the withdrawal of the Khazars to the north of the Caucasus
 985: Oghuz Yabgu State's alliance with the Russians against the Volga Bulgarian State
 986: Settlements of the Seljuks in the south of Kazakhstan by breaking away from the Oghuz Yabgu State

Asia and Africa 
 905: The end of the Tulunid dynasty in Egypt by the Abbasids
 935: Another Turkic dynasty, the Ikhshidid dynasty, seized power in Egypt and dominated Syria, Palestine, Hejaz and northern Sudan.
 977: Sabuktigin establishs  Ghaznavid dynasty in Khorasan(modern-day Afghanistan)
 969: Termination of the rule of the Ikhshidid dynasty by the Fatimid State

11th century

Central Asia 
 1030: Ghaznavid Empire reaches to its greatest extent under Mahmud of Ghazni.
 1036: The Kansu Uyghur Kingdom came under the rule of the Mongolian Tankut Kingdom.
 1042: The division of the Karakhanid State into East and West
 1050: The destruction of the Kimek Khanate by the invasion of the Kipchaks
 1089: Samarkand-centered Western Karakhanid State entered the Seljuk nationality
 1091: The Eastern Karakhanid State, based in Kashgar, became subject to the Seljuks.
 1092: As a result of the Great Seljuk State being dragged into internal turmoil, the two Karakhanid states became independent again.

Eastern Europe 
 1016: The destruction of the Khazar Khaganate by the Russians and the Byzantine Empire
 1037: Settlement of Pechenegs defeated by the Russians in Romania
 1061-1068: The Kipchaks, who defeated the Russians, captured the north of the Black Sea and Ukraine
 1091: After the Battle of Manzikert, the Pechenegs, who attacked the Byzantine Empire, which was in turmoil, were destroyed by the Byzantine-Kipchak alliance around Enez.
 1093: Cuman–Kipchak Confederation decisive defeat of the Kievan Rus' at the Battle of the Stuhna River.

Asia 
 1038: Establishment of the Seljuk State in Khorasan.
 1040: In the Battle of Dandanaqan, the Seljuks defeated the Ghaznavids and spread towards Persia.
 1048: The Seljuks, who defeated the Byzantine-Georgian alliance at the Battle of Kapetron, entered Eastern Anatolia.
 1055: Seljuks conquer Baghdad and seize the Abbasid Caliphate. 
 1064: Seljuks conquer Ani Castle and break the Armenian-Georgian resistance
 1071: The Oghuz Turcomans who have defeated the Byzantine Empire at the Battle of Manzikert, started settlements at Anatolia.
 1072: Establishment of Danishmend Principality in Sivas as subordinate to Great Seljuks
 1077: Establishment of the Seljuk Sultanate of Rûm whose capital is Iznik as subordinate to the Great Seljuks.
 1081: The construction of the navy on the Aegean coast of the Çaka Principality and the establishment of the Turkish Naval Forces
 1085: Establishment of the Syrian Seljuk State.
 1092: As a result of the murder of Sultan Melikşah by the Order of Assassins, the Great Seljuk State was dragged into internal turmoil
 1096: The destruction of the pioneers of the First Crusade by the Anatolian Seljuk State in Iznik
 1096-1099: As a result of the First Crusade, Iznik and Western Anatolia were taken back by Byzantium, and Crusader statelets were formed on the Syrian and Palestinian coasts.

South Asia 
 1001-1027: The expeditions of Mahmud of Ghazni, the ruler of the Ghaznavids, in Indian subcontinent resulted in the spread of Turkic sovereignty and Islam to the north of India
 1037-1059: The struggle of the Ghaznavids with the Seljuk Empire resulted into Khorasan and Iran being dominated by the Seljuks
 1059: Peace treaty between Ghaznavids and Seljuks
 1079-1080: Ghaznavids's defeat of the Ghurid dynasty, which gained power in Afghanistan

12th century

Asia 
 1100: The Danishmends defeated the Principality of Antakya in Malatya and definitively stopped the Crusaders' advance to Southeastern Anatolia.
 1101: The defeat of the Anatolian Seljuk State and the Danishmends by the Crusaders in Kastamonu and Merzifon
 1104: The Great Seljuk State defeated the Crusaders in Harran and blocked their advance to the Euphrates.
 1104: Establishment of Börüoğulları Atabey in Damascus
 1105-1128: Seljuks struggle against the Crusaders in Syria, the resistance of Damascus and Aleppo to the Crusader sieges
 1127: Establishment of Zengi Atabeylik in Mosul
 1127-1174: The struggle of the Zengid's with the Crusaders
 1144: The conquest of Urfa by the Zengid's
 1144: Establishment of Beytegin Atabeylik in Erbil
 1147-1149: Organized after the fall of Urfa, in the Second Crusade, the Anatolian Seljuk State defeated the Crusaders' German army in Eskişehir and Ladik, the Zengid's repelled the Crusaders' Siege of Damascus
 1150: The elimination of the Urfa County, one of the four Crusader states, by the Zengids
 1154: Elimination of the Börioğulları Atabey by the Zengids
 1173-1178: The Anatolian Seljuk State became the only power in Anatolia by capturing all the lands of the Danishmends.
 1174-1183: Salahaddin Ayyubi's Ending Zengid sovereignty in Syria
 1176: The defeat of the Byzantines by the Anatolian Seljuk State in the Battle of Myriokephalon, the finalization of the Seljuk sovereignty in Anatolia
 1190: The invasion of Konya by the German arm of the Crusaders in the Third Crusade, the disintegration of the German army after the drowning of the German Emperor Frederick Barbarossa in Silifke

Iran and Central Asia 
 1092-1118: Internal turmoil and emergence of semi-independent atabeyliks within the Great Seljuk State
 1132: The Mongolian Karahitays started to move towards Turkic lands by eliminating the Qocho.
 1134: Karahitays overthrow the Eastern Karakhanids
 1137: Karahitays overthrow the Western Karakhanids and demolish their dominance in Central Asia
 1141: The collapse of the Great Seljuk State, which was defeated by the Karahitays in the Battle of Qatwan
 1154-1157: Dissolution of the Great Seljuk State after the rebellion of the Oghuzs, the independence of the Khorezmshahs State
 1182-1194: The Khwarazmshahs conquered Transoxiana by defeating Iran, Khorasan and Karahitays
 1188: The elimination of the Kerman Seljuk State, one of the successors of the Great Seljuk State, by the Oghuzes
 1194: The abolition of the Iraqi Seljuk State, one of the successors of the Great Seljuk State, by the Khwarazmshahs State.

South Asia 
 1135: The Seljuk army re-entering Ghazni and taxing the Ghaznavids again
 1148-1151: Great destruction caused by the Ghurids after capturing Ghazni
 1152:  Seljuks capture of Ghazni from Ghurids
 1157-1163: With the disintegration of the Great Seljuk State, Ghazni and Afghanistan fell back into the hands of the Ghurids.
 1186: The conquest of the Ghaznavid State, which continued to dominate Punjab, with Lahore as its capital, caused by the Ghurids.

Eastern Europe 

 1111-1116: Kipchak tribes defeated by the Russians
 1123: Georgians supported by Kipchaks expel Great Seljuks from Tbilisi
 1150: The Kipchaks regain their strength in the Dnieper.
 1154: The Kipchaks, who repulsed the Russians, re-established their dominance around Kharkiv.
 1157-1174: Conflicts between Volga Bulgarian and Russians
 1174-1185: Military successes of the Kipchaks against the Russians
 1200: The dissolution of the Kimek–Kipchak confederation

13th century

Asia and the Middle East 
 1202: The expansion of the Anatolian Seljuk State to Eastern Anatolia by eliminating the Saltuklu Principality
 1207: The opening of the Anatolian Seljuk State to the Mediterranean with the conquest of Antalya
 1214: The opening of the Anatolian Seljuk State to the Black Sea with the conquest of Sinop
 1228: Elimination of the Mengüçlü Principality by the Anatolian Seljuk State
 1230: The Khorezmshahs, who escaped from the Mongol invasion and advanced to Anatolia, were stopped by the Anatolian Seljuk State in the Battle of Yassıçemen
 1239: The revolt of Baba İshak weakened the Anatolian Seljuk State.
 1243: The defeat of the Anatolian Seljuk State by the Mongols in the Battle of Kösedağ
 1250: The seizure of power by the Turkish-origin Mamluk Sultanate in Egypt, putting an end to the Ayyubids
 Nureddin Bey laid the foundations of the principality in Karaman
 1299: Founding of the Ottoman State

Central Asia 
 1212: The elimination of the Karakhanids, who ruled in Fergana, by the Khwarazmshahs State.

South Asia 
 1206: Establishment of Delhi Sultanate by Turkic-origin slave commanders
 1236: Delhi Sultanate's dominance of all of northern India, Kashmir and Bangladesh
 1290: Turkic-origin Khalji dynasty seized power in the Delhi Sultanate

14th century 
 1320-1424: Tughluk Dynasty in Delhi established and ruled most of the India.
 1346: The Ottomans entered Europe.
 1361: Conquest of Edirne by the Ottomans occurred.
 1370: Timur's seizure of power, establishment of Timurid Empire.
 1382: Tokhtamysh leads the Golden Horde's Army and sets Moscow on fire.
 1389: Battle of Kosovo: Ottoman domination in the Balkans
 1389-1403: Reign of Bayezid
 1398: Timur's military expedition to India

15th century

Asia 
 1402: Battle of Ankara between Timur and Bayezid I
 1406: Re-emergence of Akkoyunlu and Karakoyunlu people on the stage of history
 1453: Conquest of Istanbul by Mehmed the Conqueror
 1453-1504: The golden age of the Akkoyunlu state.

Central Asia 
 1405: Timur's death
 1405-1447: Arrival of Shahruh in Herat
 1447-1449: Ulugh Beg
 1456: Establishment of the Kazakh Khanate

Eastern Europe 
 1430: Crimean Khanate formed
 1445: Establishment of the Khanate of Kazan
 1462-1505: Astrakhan Khanate created
 1473: Sultan Husayn Bayqara: Timurid Renaissance

Modern era (1500 CE – present)

16th century

Eastern Europe 
 1502: The Crimean Khanate's destruction of the Golden Horde State
 1552: Russia's annexation of the Kazan Khanate
 1556: The annexation of the Astrakhan Khanate by Russia
 1557: Russia's annexation of the Nogai Khanate
 1571: Crimean Khanate burns Moscow
 1580-1598: Russia's elimination of the Siberian Khanate

Central Asia 
 1500: Muhammed Shaybani and Uzbeks in Transoxiana
 1510: The defeat of Muhammed Shaybani by Shah Ismail

Asia 
 1502: Ismail's establishment of the Safavid Dynasty in Iran
 1514: The Battle of Çaldıran, the settlement of the Ottomans in Eastern Anatolia
 1516: Battle of Ridaniye, Ottomans taking Syria and Palestine from the Mamluk State
 1517: Ottoman domination in Hijaz
 1534: Ottomans taking Iraq from Safavids
 1538: Ottoman domination in Yemen
 1551: Ottoman rule reaching Qatar and Oman
 1578: Ottomans reaching the Caspian Sea
 1590: Ottoman conquest of the entire Caucasus and Western Iran

South Asia 
 1526: Establishment of the Mughal Empire

Africa 
 1516: Establishment of Ottoman administration in Algeria
 1516-1517: The Ottomans' destruction of the Mamluk State, Ottoman domination in Egypt
 1551: Beginning of Ottoman rule in Libya
 1557: Establishment of the Abyssinian Province by the Ottomans
 1574: Beginning of Ottoman rule in Tunisia
 1577: The spread of Ottoman rule in Fezzan
 1576-1580: Ottoman influence in Morocco

17th century

Eastern Europe 
 1600: The defeat of the Siberian Khanate.
 1606: The Treaty of Zitvatorok, which symbolized the Ottoman Empire's peak
 1683: Siege of Vienna by the Ottomans.
 1699: Treaty of Karlowitz. The decline of the Ottomans.

Asia

Central Asia 
 1605: Russian invasion of Yenisey
 1615-1650: The struggle of the Yenisei Kyrgyz people against the Russians
 1620: Russia's annexation of Yakut lands
 1628: Dolgan's domination by Russia
 1628-1630: Another Mongolian tribe, the Kalmyks, who were defeated by the Eastern Mongols, trampled on Kazakhstan and settled in the Volga region.
 1634-1642: Russia's suppression of the Yakut revolts
 1639: Russia's Reaching the Pacific Ocean
 1680: Mongol capture East Turkestan, end of Chagatai Khanate

South Asia 
 1628-1658: Shah Jahan, emperor of India.
 1658-1707: Aurangzeb, emperor of India.

18th century

Eastern Europe 
 1742-1775: Pugachev War in Russia (Tatar uprising)
 1783: Annexation of Crimea by the Russians.

Asia 
 1717-1730: Tulip Era of the Ottomans.
 1736-1747: Nader Shah of Turkoman origin established Afsharid Empire, owning the identity of Turkic Afshar tribes. 
 1794: Qajar Dynasty founded in Iran by a Turk.

Central Asia 
 1709: Establishment of Kokand Khanate
 1709-1718: The Dzungarian-Kazakh Khanate Conflict
 1718: The division of the Kazakh Khanate into three kingdoms.
 1721: Russia's annexation of Khakassia
 1731: The minor part of the Kazakh Khanate came under Russian protection.
 1740-1747: Iranian domination in the Khiva Khanate
 1755-1759: The Manchu Dynasty, which took over the administration in China, seized East Turkestan which was in the hands of the Dzungarians
 1755: Tuva under the rule of the Manchu Dynasty, which seized power in China
 1756: Russia's capture of the Altai region
 1785: Manghud's takeover of the Bukhara Khanate

Africa 
 1705: The Huseyni Dynasty appointed in Tunisia, which was a part of the Ottoman Empire
 1798-1799: Egypt expedition of Napoleon Bonaparte. Turkish-French conflicts.

19th century

Eastern Europe 
 1829: Greece's independence
 1878: Treaty of Berlin, Serbia, Montenegro, Romania gaining their independence, Bulgaria gaining autonomy
 1881: Greek annexation of Thessaly
 1881: Atatürk's birth
 1885: Bulgaria's annexation of Eastern Rumelia
 1813: Russia's annexation of Dagestan and Azerbaijan
 1827: Russian domination of the Balkars
 1828: Karachays' entry into Russian domination
 1828: Russia's annexation of Yerevan and Nakhchivan
 1829: Russia's annexation of Akhaltsikhe
 1839: Tanzimat Edict in the Ottoman Empire
 1876: The first constitution of the Ottoman Empire legislated.

Central Asia 
 1820: The Great Juz of the Kazakh Khanate came under the rule of the Kokand Khanate
 1847: The lands of the Kazakh Khanate completely passed into the hands of Russia
 1851-1854: The defeat of the Khiva Khanate to the Russians
 1864: The start of Russian expeditions to West Turkestan
 1865: Establishment of Kashgar Khanate in East Turkestan
 1866: The Emirate of Bukhara came under Russian rule
 1868: The Kokand Khanate came under Russian rule
 1871: Russian occupation of Lake Balkhash
 1873: The Khiva Khanate came under Russian rule
 1876: Russia's annexation of the Khanate of Kokand
 1877-1878: China's elimination of the Khanate of Kashgar
 1881-1884: Russia's annexation of Turkmenistan

South Asia 
 1805: The Mughal State came under the auspices of the British who defeated the Maratha Confederation
 1857: The British overthrow the Mughal State

Africa 
 1807: British abolish slave trade, Royal Navy patrol around Africa to intercept slave ships
 1822: Sudan's entry into Ottoman rule
 1830-1842: French invasion of Algeria
 1831-1840: Ottoman-Egyptian struggle, Egypt gaining autonomy
 1869: Opening of the Suez Canal
 1881: Second French invasion of Algeria
 1882: British invasion of Egypt
 1885: Italian invasion of Habesh
 1885: End of Turkish rule in Sudan
 1888: British invasion of Somalia, end of Turkish presence in Horn of Africa

20th century 
 1905: Beginning of Jadidism movements.
 1910-1920: Alash Horda Government of Kazakhs and Kyrgyz
 1911-1912: Invasion of Tripoli by Italy
 1912: Balkan wars
 1915-1916: Gallipoli Campaign
 1917: Turkistan's declaration of autonomy
 1918: The Armistice of Mudros was signed between Turkey and the Allied Powers.
 1919-1922: The Turkish War of Independence took place.
 1919-1928: Basmachi Uprising against the Soviet Union
 1921-1944: Tuvan People's Republic
 1922: Turkish victory over Greeks
 1923: Turkey proclaimed to be a Republic
 1932-1934: East Turkestan Islamic Republic of Uyghurs in China
 1938: Ataturk's death
 1944: Short-lived East Turkestan Republic established with the help of the Russian army
 1955: Xinjiang Uyghur Autonomous Region: Declaring Xinjiang (East Turkistan) an autonomous region
 1971: European withdrawal from Central Asia
 1974: Turkish invasion of Cyprus
 1983: The declaration of independence of the Turkish Republic of Northern Cyprus
 1988: The beginning of the Azeri-Armenian conflict
 1990: Soviet invasion of Baku
 1991: The collapse of the USSR and the emergence of the Commonwealth of Independent States
 1992: Admission of the CIS Turkic republics to the UN:
 Kazakhstan
 Uzbekistan
 Azerbaijan
 Turkmenistan
 Kyrgyzstan
 1992: The first Turkic Speaking Countries Summit was held in Ankara on 30 October 1992.
 1993: The occupation of a region of Azerbaijan by the Armenians.
 1993: In 1993, the Turkish Culture and Arts Joint Administration was established in Almaty, which provides cooperation in the fields of culture and arts of Turkic Speaking Countries.
 1993: The first Turkic Congress, which was a cultural, economic and political forum and was attended by all Turkic states and communities and related communities.

21st century 
 2005: Tulip revolution in Kyrgyzstan.
 2005: Kazakh leader Nursultan Nazarbayev's proposal to establish a common market in Central Asia in his address to the nation.
 2005: Andijan massacre in Uzbekistan
 2006: Baku-Tbilisi-Ceyhan pipeline put into service.
 2007: The first meeting of riparian countries to determine the status of the Caspian Sea.
 2008: Establishment of the Parliamentary Assembly of Turkic Speaking Countries between Turkey, Azerbaijan, Kazakhstan and Kyrgyzstan on 21 November 2008.
 2009: Establishment of Organization of Turkic states.
 2013: Gezi Park Protests
 2016: Turkish coup attempt by Fethullah Gülen

Books

Notes

Turkish books 
 İbrahim Kafesoğlu, Türk Millî Kültürü, Ankara, 1983.
 Zeki. Velidi Togan, Umumi Türk Tarihine Giriş, İstanbul, 1970.
 Faruk Sümer, Oğuzlar, İstanbul, 1980.
 Bahaeddin Ögel, İslamiyetten Önce Türk Kültür Tarihi, Ankara, 1962.
 Bahaeddin Ögel, Türk Kültür Tarihine Giriş, İstanbul, 1978.
 Bahaeddin Ögel, Büyük Hun İmparatorluğu Tarihi, Ankara, 1981.
 Çeçen Anıl, Tarihte Türk Devletleri, İstanbul, 1986.
 O. Esad Arseven, Türk Sanat Tarihi, İstanbul, 1955.
 Muharrem Ergin, Orhun Abideleri, İstanbul, 1977.
 Erol Güngör, Tarihte Türkler, İstanbul, 1989.
 Abdülkadir İnan, Eski Türk Dini Tarihi, İstanbul, 1976.
 A. Nimet Kurat, Karadeniz Kuzeyindeki Türk Kavimleri ve Devletleri, Ankara, 1972.
 Hüseyin Namık Orkun, Eski Türk Yazıtları, İstanbul, 1986.
 Hüseyin Namık Orkun, Türk Tarihi, Ankara, 1946.
 Osman Turan, Türk Cihan Hakimiyeti Mefrukesi Tarihi, İstanbul, 1978.
 Bahaeddin Ögel, Türk Mitolojisi, Ankara, 1971.
 Yusuf Hikmet Bayur, Hindistan Tarihi, Ankara, 1946.
 İbrahim Kafesoğlu, Selçuklu Tarihi, İstanbul, 1972.
 İbrahim Kafesoğlu, Harzemşahlar Devleti Tarihi, Ankara, 1956.
 M. Altay Köymen, Büyük Selçuklu İmparatorluğu Tarihi, Ankara, 1954.
 Çağatay Uluçay, İlk Müslüman Türk Devletleri, İstanbul, 1977.
 Faruk Sümer, Karakoyunlular, Ankara, 1984.
 A.N. Kurat, Peçenek Tarihi, İstanbul, 1937.
 B. Yenilmez, Yenilmez, Rize, 2002.

English and foreign books 
 R. Grousset, L'Empire des steppes, Paris, 1960 (Türkçe çevirisi: Reşat Uzmen-Bozkır İmparatorluğu, 1996.)
 DE. Guignes, Histoire generale des Huns des Turcs et des Mongols, Paris, 1756.
 Jean-Paul Roux, Historie des Turcs, 1984.
 Jean-Paul Roux, Timur, 1994.
 Fayard Paris, Historie des Turcs, 1984.
 D.Sinor, Aspects of Altaic Civilization, 1963.
 M. Barthold, Turkestan down to the Mongol Invansıon, Londra, 1968.
 E. Berl, Historie de l'Europe d'Attila a Tamerlan, Paris, 1946.
 M.A. Czaplıcka, The Turks of Central Asia in History and at the Present Day, Oxford, 1918.
 W. Eberhard, Kultur und Siedlung der Randvölker China, 1942.
 L. Hambis, La Haute-Asie, Paris, 1953.
 Hammer-Purgstall, Von, Historie de l'Empire ottoman depuis son origine jusqu!a nos jours, Paris, 1835.
 H.H. Howorth, History of the Mongols, Londra, 1876.
 Jean-Paul Roux, Türklerin Tarihi - Pasifikten Akdenize 2000 Yıl, 2004

See also 
 Outline of the Ottoman Empire
 List of Turkic dynasties and countries

References

Sources 
 
 
 
 
 
  (First paperback edition)
 
 
 
 
 
 

 
History of Central Asia
History of Asia
History of Africa
History of Europe
History of the Middle East
Turkic people
Turkish people